St. Josaphat Roman Catholic Church is a Roman Catholic church located at 715 East Canfield Street in Detroit, Michigan. It was listed on the National Register of Historic Places in 1982 and designated a Michigan State Historic Site in 1985. Since 2013, it has been one of two churches that comprise Mother of Divine Mercy Parish.

History
In 1889, the Polish community of St. Albertus Roman Catholic Church was outgrowing the capacity of the church, and the parish of St. Josaphat was started on June first to serve the burgeoning community. The church is named after St. Josaphat Kuntsevych, a Greek Catholic priest, who became archbishop of Polotsk, Poland, (now Belarus) in 1617. He was martyred in 1623 and canonized in 1867, thus it is likely that this parish, founded only 22 years later, was among the first to bear his name. The church was located on Canfield not far west of the Sweetest Heart Of Mary Roman Catholic Church. It is possible that the choice of location was intended to compete with Sweetest Heart, which was at the time a Polish Catholic church unsanctioned by the diocese. On February 2, 1890, parishioners dedicated the first building of St. Josaphat, a combination church and school. However, in the next decade, the church grew to over 1,000 families under the leadership of Father Razadkowski. In response, Razadkowski raised funds to build the current church. The structure opened in 1901, along with a rectory and janitor's home. A school was built in the 1920s.

By 1960, the Polish community that had once attended the church had scattered to the suburbs. The school was closed and demolished, and St. Josaphat struggled with dwindling membership and the upkeep of the aging church. However, the parish began a building rehabilitation program, and it continues to serve the Polish community.

In 2004, St. Josaphat became the home for the Archdiocese of Detroit's first regular celebrations of the Tridentine Latin Mass since the liturgical reforms following the Second Vatican Council. This ceased in 2016, when responsibility for this service was entrusted to the Institute of Christ the King at the St. Joseph Oratory in the city.

Architecture

The Victorian Romanesque Revival and Gothic Revival style church was designed by Joseph G. Kastler and William E. N. Hunter. It was built by the Jermolowicz Brothers and local carpenters, Harcus and Lang. The exterior of the church is built from red and orange brick, extensively trimmed with Bedford Indiana buff limestone. The stained glass windows, depicting Mary & Joseph and the twelve apostles, were made by the Detroit Stained Glass Works.

The interior of the church contains five altars. On the main altar there is a painting of St. Josaphat, dressed in the vestments of an eastern rite bishop. The side altars are dedicated to the Virgin Mary and St. Joseph, and in the transept of the church are altars dedicated to Saints Anthony of Padua and Francis of Assisi. The woodwork in the church is crafted of white oak, and there is an extensive collection of murals on the walls.

Current information

The church was placed on the National Register of Historic Places in 1982, and received historic recognition from the city of Detroit in 1983, and as a Michigan State Historic Site from the state of Michigan in 1985.

On June 19, 2013, a decree from his excellency Allen H. Vigneron, Archbishop of Detroit, created the new Mother of Divine Mercy Parish from the clustered parishes of St. Josaphat, Sweetest Heart of Mary and St. Joseph. St. Joseph Church was separated from Mother of Divine Mercy Parish in October 2016 to form St. Joseph Oratory.

Effective July 1, 2013, Fr. Gregory Tokarski became new pastor of the parish.

In November 2013, the main spire suffered structural damage during a winter storm. Because the congregation did not have the funds to make necessary repairs, it announced on November 19, 2013, that the spire would be demolished and replaced with a small roof.

See also
Roman Catholic Archdiocese of Detroit

References

Further reading

External links
 Official Parish Website of St. Josaphat Church.
 St. Josaphat from the Archdiocese of Detroit.

Roman Catholic churches in Detroit
Polish-American culture in Detroit
Churches in the Roman Catholic Archdiocese of Detroit
Roman Catholic churches completed in 1901
Michigan State Historic Sites in Wayne County, Michigan
National Register of Historic Places in Detroit
Churches on the National Register of Historic Places in Michigan
Religious organizations established in 1889
Gothic Revival church buildings in Michigan
Romanesque Revival church buildings in Michigan
1889 establishments in Michigan
20th-century Roman Catholic church buildings in the United States